Centrifugal Funk is the second and final studio album by the Mark Varney Project (MVP), released in 1991 through Legato Records; a remastered edition was reissued in 2004 through Tone Center Records. This line-up of the group features guitarists Frank Gambale, Brett Garsed and Shawn Lane. The album consists primarily of covers of existing jazz fusion compositions, save for one track performed by Lane—"Lane's Blitz"—which he later dismissed as an impromptu warm-up rather than a planned solo, and thus his dislike for it. Varney has disputed Lane's version of events, but the track was omitted on the remaster.

The cover art on the original release features a tongue-in-cheek disclaimer to listeners: "Warning: Contains guitar performances of unparalleled speed, taste and virtuosity. Not for the faint of heart!", while the back cover has an invitation from Varney asking fans to send in demo tapes of potential guitarists for his label, in return for a named mention within the credits on a future album, as well as five Legato releases mailed to them for free.

Critical reception

Robert Taylor at AllMusic rated Centrifugal Funk three stars out of five, calling it "an exhausting listen" and the songs "fairly weak". Praise was given to the individual talents of Gambale, Garsed and Lane, while criticism was directed at drummer Joey Heredia. "Hey Tee Bone" and "Love Struck" were listed as highlights.

Track listing

Personnel
Frank Gambale – guitar (except track 7)
Brett Garsed – guitar (tracks 2, 3, 8)
Shawn Lane – guitar (tracks 2, 3, 5, 7, 8)
Mike O'Neill – guitar (except track 7)
T.J. Helmerich – guitar (track 8), remastering (reissue)
Freddy Ravel – keyboard
Joey Heredia – drums
Kevin Ricard – percussion
Jimmy Earl – bass, arrangement, production
Steve Tavaglione – saxophone, EWI
Alan Hirshberg – engineering, mixing, mastering
Mark Varney – musical concept, executive production

Notes

References

External links
In Review: MVP "Centrifugal Funk" at Guitar Nine Records

Frank Gambale albums
Brett Garsed albums
Shawn Lane albums
1991 albums
Collaborative albums